Thain Andrew Simon (April 24, 1922 — September 18, 2007) was a Canadian ice hockey defenceman. He played three games in the National Hockey League for the Detroit Red Wings during the 1946–47 season. Thain is the brother of the former NHL player, Cully Simon.

Simon was born in Brockville, Ontario.

Career statistics

Regular season and playoffs

External links
 

1922 births
2007 deaths
Brantford Lions players
Canadian expatriates in the United States
Canadian ice hockey defencemen
Detroit Red Wings players
Ice hockey people from Ontario
Indianapolis Capitals players
Omaha Knights (USHL) players
St. Louis Flyers players
Sportspeople from Brockville